Portrait of Alison is a 1956 British atmospheric crime film directed by Guy Green. It was based on a BBC television series Portrait of Alison which aired the same year.

In the United States the film was released as Postmark for Danger.

It was also known as Alison.

Plot
A car plunges over a cliff in Italy. Both passengers, newspaperman Lewis Forrester and actress Alison Ford, are killed.

In London, Lewis's brother, Tim, is an artist. He is painting his favourite model, Jill, for a beer advertisement. She tells him that she is giving up her party life to marry Carmichael. However, she is kissing Tim passionately when a police inspector arrives.

Tim gets a strange commission, from a Mr Smith, to paint Smith’s dead daughter, the car crash victim. He gives him a photo to work from and a beautiful blue dress to use for posing the picture. Jill sees the dress and admires both it and the portrait of Alison. She goes to meet her fiance for lunch but forgets a box she was to give him.

Jill is found dead in Tim's flat wearing the blue dress. The face on the portrait has been erased and the photo on which it was based has disappeared. The police arrive and ask if they can open the box. It contains an empty bottle of Chianti with a British label: Nightingale & Son - a firm that does not exist. The chianti bottle is sketched in the corner of a postcard from Rome sent to Tim from Lewis. Tim is a prime suspect in the murder.

Meanwhile we learn Alison is not dead, as she is seen walking around London. She appears at Tim's door and explains that the woman killed in the car crash was a hitchhiker but everyone presumed it was her. She is involved in an international diamond smuggling deal.

Tim invites the police in order to prove that Alison is alive, but she has disappeared. She has gone to see her father in a hotel. He seems involved in the diamond smuggling.

Allison solicits the help of Forrester's brother, Tim. Then, as the story unfolds, a number of mysterious, unsolved questions keep emerging, along with two more murders and a suicide. It turns out  that no less than four of the major characters are part of the international ring of diamond thieves, and that an independent blackmailer is at work as well.

After arrests are made Tim and Alison are alone. He asks if she can stay with him until he completes her portrait. She asks how long this will take. When he answers all my life she says that's fine.

Cast
 Terry Moore as Alison Ford
 Robert Beatty as Tim Forrester
 William Sylvester as Dave Forrester
 Geoffrey Keen as Inspector Colby 
 Josephine Griffin as Jill Stewart
 Allan Cuthbertson as Henry Carmichael
 Henry Oscar as John Smith 
 William Lucas as Reg Dorking
 Terence Alexander as Fenby
 Sam Kydd as Bill, the telephone engineer

Production
The film was based on a TV series, Portrait of Alison.

Film rights were bought by Tony Owen, the husband of Donna Reed who set up a film making operation in England. Ken Hughes co wrote the script.

Terry Moore was borrowed from 20th Century Fox to star. Filming began in April 1955.

In May 1955 RKO agreed to distribute in the US.

Reception
"The story is moderately eventful" said the Monthly Film Bulletin.

See also
List of American films of 1956

References

External links
 
 
Review of film at Variety
Complete film at Internet Archive

1958 films
1956 crime films
1956 films
1950s English-language films
Films based on television series
Films directed by Guy Green
British black-and-white films
British crime films